Alexander Gusakovsky (Russian: Александр Владиславович Гусаковский; born 25 August 1970) is a Russian politician serving as a senator from the Legislative Assembly of Volgograd Oblast since 15 October 2021.

Alexander Gusakovsky is under personal sanctions introduced by the European Union, the United Kingdom, the USA, Canada, Switzerland, Australia, Ukraine, New Zealand, for ratifying the decisions of the "Treaty of Friendship, Cooperation and Mutual Assistance between the Russian Federation and the Donetsk People's Republic and between the Russian Federation and the Luhansk People's Republic" and providing political and economic support for Russia's annexation of Ukrainian territories.

Biography

Alexander Gusakovsky was born on 25 August 1970 in Izhevsk. In 1992, he graduated from the Saint Petersburg State Institute of Film and Television. Afterwards, he worked as an exhibition organizer. From 2001 to 2004, Gusakovsky was a commercial director of the art workshops in the village of Kholui, Ivanovo Oblast. In 2004, he was appointed commercial director of the company "Russian lacquer miniature". In 2007, he founded the LLC "Vozrozhdenie" Palekhskiye Masterskiye, specializing in icon painting, church painting, and lacquer miniature. On 13 September 2015, he was elected deputy of the Council of the Palekh urban settlement of the 3rd convocation. On 15 October 2021, Gusakovsky became the senator of the from the Legislative Assembly of Ivanovo Oblast.

References

Living people
1970 births
United Russia politicians
21st-century Russian politicians
People from Izhevsk
Members of the Federation Council of Russia (after 2000)